Belton & Burgh was a station in the Norfolk village of Belton on the outskirts of Great Yarmouth but also served the village of Burgh Castle about 3.5 km away. It once saw trains on the main line from Yarmouth South Town to London, but was closed in 1959 as part of a major re-evaluation of the British Railways network. It was on a connecting branch between Great Yarmouth and Beccles.

The site of the station can still be located. It is now a modern house where Station Road South meets Station Road North. A notable bump in the road signifies where the track once crossed. The station was on the left, travelling north to south, with the house having a "Platform 3" sign hanging by the driveway. On the right, an access road to a camp site is on the old track bed going off towards St. Olaves.

References

External links
 Belton and Burgh station in 1963
 Belton and Burgh Station on 1946 O. S. map

Disused railway stations in Norfolk
Former Great Eastern Railway stations
Railway stations in Great Britain opened in 1859
Railway stations in Great Britain closed in 1959
1859 establishments in England
1959 disestablishments in England